The 1944–45 Swedish Division I season was the first season of Swedish Division I. Hammarby IF defeated Sodertalje SK in the league final, 2 games to 1.

Regular season

Northern Group

Southern Group

Final
Södertälje SK – Hammarby IF 4–2, 1–2, 4–5

External links
 1944–45 season

1944–45 in Swedish ice hockey leagues
Swedish Division I seasons
Swedish